Olympiacos Volos Football Club is a Greek professional football club based in the city of Volos, Greece. They are currently participating in the Gamma Ethniki.

History
In 1938 Olympiacos achieves the biggest distinction made from a provincial team at the time, succeeding to enter the final eight in Greek Football Cup.

In 1947 Olympiacos wins its first Thessalian championship. The year 1954 is very successful for the team. Furthermore, Olympiakos make a great win over Doxa Dramas in an away game and Olympiakos becomes Panprovincional champion of Northern Greece and wins its ticket to the Panhellenic Championship, where they take the decent 5th place.

The 1955 year then became a notable one in the club history: while the city of Volos was damaged by some earthquakes, Olympiakos Volou had a scheduled Greek Cup match to play in Athens against AEK for the Greek Cup in Athens. Due to the city being heavily damaged and due to lack of media information, it seemed Olympiakos Volou would not have managed to get to Athens in time. However, the team ultimately managed to arrive in the Greek capital city and even eliminated AEK by beating them 0–1 and go further to the quarter-finals.

In 1960 the team reached the round of 16 in Greek Cup. In 1961 it merged with local club Ethnikos Volos, with Ethnikos-Olympiakos Volou being the new denomination, despite this the team is still commonly referred as Olympiakos Volou. In the same year Olympiakos wins the Central Greece championship and had the opportunity to win the promotion in A' Ethniki through a play-off match, which the team lost.

In 1962–63 Olympiakos completed the B' Ethniki league in a remarkable fifth place. In the following season the team ended first, together with Trikala, but lost the promotion once again in a play-off match. This was followed by a fourth and a second place in the two next seasons, before Olympiakos finally managed to get promoted to the top flight in 1966, after winning the Panthessalian championship and then defeating Panelefsiniakos and Kavala on play-offs.

The first top flight campaign for the club was however not successful, as Olympiakos was relegated in B Ethniki. Despite this, the club promptly managed to recover from that, and get back to the top flight in the very next season after winning Veria in a two-legged play-off. The same year Olympiakos reached the Greek Cup round of 16. Another relegation followed in 1968, after the club ended the league in 16th place.

In the year 1970, Olympiacos won again B' Ethniki and returned in the A' Ethniki for the third time. In 1971–72 the club finished in 13th place its top flight campaign, a result confirmed also in 1972–73 ends in the 13th place.

In the following season, the club ended in 14th place, which would normally have allowed Olympiacos Volos to stay in the first division; nevertheless the Greek federation decided to reduce the number of top-flight teams, thus being relegated to the second tier. In the year 1975–76 Olympiacos ended in third place and even eighth the next season, the latter being the worst placement for the club from the creation of B' Ethniki. In 1977 the club had a much more impressive season, losing the promotion only in the final game to Larissa. Third and sixth place in the two following seasons preceded a 1980 campaign ended in a runner-up placement, only behind Iraklis Thessaloniki; a result that was confirmed the following season, where Olympiacos Volos lost promotion to Makedonikos, another Thessalonicean club.

After a fifth place in 1983–84, Olympiacos Volos were relegated in Gama Ethniki in 1984–85 after 21 years in the two Greek professional divisions club after another Volos-based team, Niki Volos, lost a game against Veria which saved the Imathian team from relegation at Olympiacos Volos place and then a big competition created between the two local teams.

The club returned to the second tier only 1986, and even returned to the top flight in 1988. In 1988–1989, the team was strengthened with the addition of Hungarian scorer Imre Boda, who won the league topscorer title, being instrumental in keeping his side into the top flight, ending season in 11th place. Olympiakos returned to the second tier only the following season, ending the 1989–90 season in 17th place. In the 1990s, the club did not achieve any notable success, being relegated once again to third division and staying there for four seasons before to return to the second tier in 1998–1999.

In 2000, Olympiacos made good appearances but due to some unlucky results at the end of the year, it only ended up in seventh place, which was followed by an eighth place the next year. At the same time the club administration began facing financial problems and started collapsing. As a result of that, the club had to start from fourth division, a first time in such a lower tier for the club in 2003.

In 2004, Olympiacos merged with Kassandra F.C., which competed in Beta Ethniki, into A.S.K. Olympiacos F.C. based in Volos and competing in Beta Ethniki. However, also the team competing in Delta Ethniki continued to exist as Ethnikos Olympiacos Volos FC. In 2004–05, A.S.K. Olympiacos F.C. reached the 5th place in Beta Ethniki and changed ownership, but was relegated the following year. In 2007–08, Ethnikos Olympiakos was promoted to Gamma Ethniki and A.S.K. Olympiakos F.C. to Beta Ethniki. The two teams remained separate for 4 years, until the summer of 2008 when only one Olympiakos remained in Volos. In 2008, Ethnikos Olympiakos Volou merged with Doxa Drama F.C. in Gamma Ethniki, leaving only A.S.K. Olympiakos in Volos, which participated in Beta Ethniki at the time and was later renamed Olympiakos Volos 1937 FC.

Champions and promotion after 20 years to the top league, European journey and "Koriopolis" scandal
Olympiacos finally became champion of Beta Ethniki two years later, in the 2009–2010 season, and returned to the top league after an absence of 20 years. The club had a good first season and finished 5th, qualifying for the Europa League for the first time in their history. On 28 July 2011, Olympiacos Volou was relegated to the Football League due to the ongoing match fixing scandal in Greece. They were also excluded from the 2011–12 UEFA Europa League play-off round. Olympiacos Volos appealed against their expulsion from the Super League, and won, allowing them to remain in the Super League albeit starting with a 10-point deduction. However, on 23 August 2011, the Greek Professional Sports Committee (EEA) stripped both Kavala and Olympiacos of their professional licence and demoted them to the amateur Delta Ethniki. This decision caused heavy riots in the city of Volos, between Olympiakos Volou fans and Police.

Unlike Kavala, which accepted participation in 2011–12 Delta Ethniki, Olympiacos Volos did not, waiting for a decision on their appeal against the EEA. They claimed the EEA's decision had been a violation of the self-administration of football, and on 4 November 2011 they appealed to the Court of Arbitration for Sport in Lausanne. The club remained inactive, and most of its players moved on to other teams. On 7 June 2012, EEA approved a new share transfer during a session held for this purpose, approving the transfer of shares accounting for 58.11% of PAE Olympiacos Volos to Mr. Panagiotis Botsivalis, and, thus allowing the team to participate in Greek professional leagues. After a unique decision of the Hellenic Football Federation, Olympiacos Volos will participate in the Football League (Greece).

Players

Current squad

Honours

Domestic

Leagues
Second Division
Winners (3): 1966–67, 1970–71, 2009–10
Runners-up (5): 1968–69, 1977–78, 1978–79, 1981–82, 1987–88
Third Division
Winners (2): 1998–99, 2018–19 (Group 4)
Runners-up (1): 1985–86

Fourth Division
Winners (1): 2006–07

Pan-Provincial Championship (Northern Greece champion)
Winners (1): 1954–55

 Thessaly FCA Championship
Winners (5): 1938–39, 1939–40, 1946–47, 1951–52, 1954–55

League achievements
Panhellenic Championship/Super League
Fifth place (2): 1954-55, 2010–11

Cup achievements
Greek Cup
 Semi-finalists (1): 2010–11
 Quarter-Finalists (6):  1939-40 , 1954-55 , 1970-71 , 1984-85 , 1989-90 ,   2013–14

Seasons in the 21st century 

Best position in bold.

Key: 1R = First Round, 2R = Second Round, 3R = Third Round, 4R = Fourth Round, 5R = Fifth Round, GS = Group Stage, QF = Quarter-finals, SF = Semi-finals.

European Cup history
Qualified for the first time in history
Q = Qualifying
PO = Play-off

Facilities
From the early years until 1968, Olympiacos Volos was playing in the field of Volos shooting club, near the river of Anavros. The club tried to buy this area without success.

In 1968 the club moved to EAK Volos which has a capacity of 9,000 spectators. In 2010–11 season, Olympiacos Volos moved to Panthessaliko Stadium which has a capacity of 22,700 seats. In 2013–14 season, Olympiacos Volos returned to EAK Volos. The club finally decided to use the stadium once again. This stadium has been identified as the club's true home.

The club owned a training football ground in Alli Meria Volos which was confiscated by the state due to debts. Today, relieved from the past's debts and thanks to new property, constructed a new training center in Volos' suburb of Aisonia.

References

External links
Official website 
Unofficial site 
Super League team profile 
EPAE team profile 

 
Football clubs in Thessaly
Magnesia
Sport in Volos
Association football clubs established in 1937
1937 establishments in Greece
Super League Greece 2 clubs